The Milwaukee Monarchs are a Premier Ultimate League (PUL) professional "womxn"'s ultimate team based in Milwaukee, WI. They joined the PUL in 2020 as part of the 2020 expansion.  The Monarchs are dedicated to "growing the sport with an emphasis on creating opportunities for and raising the profiles of womxn, girls, and players of diverse identities in Wisconsin and the broader Midwest"

Franchise history 
On December 3, 2019 the PUL, which had held its inaugural season in 2019, announced that it would be adding four new teams including the Milwaukee Monarchs, Washington DC Shadow, Portland Rising, and Minnesota Strike. The Monarchs were founded by Ness Cannaday, Austin Prucha, Katy Stanton, and Dan Laurila.

The 2020 season was cancelled due to the COVID-19 pandemic, so the Monarchs did not compete until 2021. The Monarchs hosted one of the three regional competitions that made up the 2021 PUL Championship Series, which served as an abbreviated competition season in response to the ongoing COVID-19 pandemic. The Monarchs defeated the Columbus Pride and Indianapolis Red to win the Midwest competition.

Leadership team 

 Ben Iberle | General manager

 Benjy Keren  | Game Day Operations

 Kevin Cannaday  | Game Day Operations

 Rachel Romaniak | Livestream Coordinator

 Adam Ruffner | Production Coordinator

 Alex Leutenegger  | Partnerships Coordinator

 Jake Wilson | Social Media & Marketing

Current coaching staff 

 Head coach – Becky LeDonne
 Assistant coach – Dan Laurila

Roster
The 2020 roster was as follows:

References 

Premier Ultimate League teams
Ultimate (sport) teams
Ultimate teams established in 2020
2020 establishments in Wisconsin
Sports in Milwaukee